Titanoceros cataxantha is a species of snout moth described by Edward Meyrick in 1884. It is found in Australia.

The larvae feed on Eucalyptus species.

References

Moths described in 1884
Epipaschiinae